Glenn Catley (born 15 March 1972) is a British retired professional boxer and former World Champion in the Super Middleweight (168lb) division.

Biography
Catley was born in Frampton Cotterell, south Gloucestershire, England.  Known as "Catman", he turned pro in 1993 as a Middleweight and Won 21 of his first 22 fights (including a victory over Kirkland Laing), and won the WBC International Middleweight Title against George Bocco. However, he then surprisingly lost this title to Hungarian Andras Galfi by TKO.

Catley came back from this unexpected setback and won the British Middleweight Title with a KO over world rated Neville Brown.

He then moved up to Super Middleweight and challenged WBC World Super Middleweight Title holder Richie Woodhall in 1998, but lost a majority decision in an all British battle. Woodhall did not perform well and many observers felt Catley had done enough to win.

Catley then had an impressive run of wins, capturing the WBO Intercontinental Super Middle title in a revenge victory over Andras Galfi, taking the IBF version against Andy Flute. Catley then travelled to Canada and scored a very impressive KO win over the teak tough and highly rated Eric Lucas. Lucas had never previously been knocked out.

These wins earned him another shot at the WBC title against World Champion Markus Beyer of Germany. In Frankfurt Catley again scored an impressive KO "on the road" (Germany being a notoriously difficult place for an away boxer to win), winning the World Title via 12th-round TKO.

Catley surprisingly lost the belt in his next fight, again in an "away" fight in South Africa against Dingaan Thobela, via 12th-round KO. Catley was leading comfortably, but seemed to tire in the heat late in the fight. Catley would later claim that he was cheated out of the title as the South African had been using "loaded" gloves.

In 2001, he got a chance to regain the Vacant WBC Super Middleweight Title against Eric Lucas. He travelled to Canada once more, but this time Lucas exacted revenge, and he was KO'd in the 7th.

He travelled to Germany to challenge Danilo Haussler for the European Title, and despite flooring Haussler in the 8th round, was somewhat harshly on the wrong end of a majority decision. Many observers felt this was a "Home Town" decision.

After a warm up against an Armenian journeyman, Catley again challenged Haussler, again in Germany. The fight was stopped after the German suffered an accidental headbutt, however he retained the title on a Technical Decision. Catley retired after this fight, which was on 1 February 2003.

He made a short comeback in 2006-7, winning KO's over two fairly respectable journeymen from Syria and Russia, before retiring for good.

Professional boxing record

See also
List of world super-middleweight boxing champions
List of British world boxing champions

References

External links

 

 

1972 births
Living people
English male boxers
People from Sudbury, Suffolk
Sportspeople from Gloucestershire
British Boxing Board of Control champions
World Boxing Council champions
World super-middleweight boxing champions